Magnolia Manor may refer to:

 Magnolia Manor (Arkadelphia, Arkansas), listed on the NRHP in Clark County, Arkansas
 Magnolia Manor (Cairo, Illinois), NRHP-listed
 Magnolia Manor (Osyka, Mississippi), listed on the NRHP in Pike County, Mississippi
 Magnolia Manor Series (book series)

See also
Magnolia Hall (disambiguation)
Magnolia Grove (disambiguation)
Magnolia Hill (disambiguation)